Intelligence Directorate of the Main Staff of the Russian Navy is one of the intelligence services in Russia, created as the Intelligence department of the Soviet navy in 1938, although it has earlier roots.

On February 16, 1938, by order of the People's Commissar of the Navy of the USSR, all matters of naval intelligence were transferred to the newly created Intelligence Department of the People's Commissariat of the Navy.

History 
The history of the creation of the Russian Navy intelligence dates back to the end of the 19th century, but was part of Military Intelligence. The Navy's independent intelligence service was established on February 16, 1938, as the NKVMF intelligence department.

Commanders 
The head of the Russian Navy's Intelligence Directorate, a Vice Admiral, also serves as Deputy Director of the Main Intelligence Directorate (GRU) of the Russian Armed Forces General Staff.  The director has a full-time deputy of rear admiral rank and manages all the forces and means of operational and agents intelligence of the fleet.

References

See also 
 Main Directorate of the Main staff
 Office of Naval Intelligence
 Naval Intelligence Division (United Kingdom)

Further reading
 Soviet Naval Special Purpose Forces: Origins and Operations in World War II, James F. Gebhardt ARMY COMBINED ARMS CENTER FORT LEAVENWORTH KS SOVIET ARMY STUDIES OFFICE – DEC 1989 – ADA231902
 Белозер Виталий Николаевич. Военно-морская разведка России: история создания, становления и развития : 1696–1917 : диссертация ... кандидата исторических наук : 07.00.02 / Белозер Виталий Николаевич; [Место защиты: Ин-т воен. истории МО РФ].- Москва, 2008
 Колпакиди А.И., Прохоров Д.П., Империя ГРУ. Очерки истории российской военной разведки. – М.: ОЛМА-ПРЕСС, 1999
 Алексеев М.А., Колпакиди А.И., Кочик В.Я. Энциклопедия военной разведки. 1918–1945 гг. М., 2012
 «ГРУ: дела и люди». — СПб: Издательский Дом «Нева»; М.: «ОЛМА-ПРЕСС», 2003. — 640с.
 И.И. Барсуков, В.М. Йолтуховский, А.Б. Кондрашов, «Адмиралы и генералы Военно-морского флота. Руководители структур политической и воспитательной работы. Биографические хроники (1917—2013)», М. издательство = «Кучково поле», 2014. 

Russian intelligence agencies
Russian Navy
Command and control
Naval intelligence